Stavroula "Voula" Mili is a Greek molecular biologist researching the regulation, functional consequences, and disease associations of localized RNAs. She is a NIH Stadtman Investigator at the National Cancer Institute.

Education 
Mili obtained her B.S. in Biology from the National and Kapodistrian University of Athens and a Ph.D. degree in Biomedical Sciences from the Icahn School of Medicine at Mount Sinai under . Her 2003 dissertation was titled, Ribonucleoprotein Complexes In Gene Expression : Remodeling Events And Common Components In Nuclear And Mitochondrial Mrna Maturation. As a postdoctoral researcher she joined Joan A. Steitz's laboratory at Yale University and subsequently Ian Macara's laboratory at the University of Virginia.

Career and research 
Mili joined the laboratory of cellular and molecular biology as a NIH Stadtman Investigator at the National Cancer Institute (NCI) in September 2012. She discovered a localization pathway that targets RNAs at cellular protrusions. The goal of Mili's laboratory is to understand the regulation, functional consequences, and disease associations of localized RNAs.

References

External links 

 

Living people
Year of birth missing (living people)
Place of birth missing (living people)
National Institutes of Health people
21st-century Greek scientists
Greek medical researchers
Women medical researchers
Cancer researchers
Greek biologists
Women molecular biologists
National and Kapodistrian University of Athens alumni
Icahn School of Medicine at Mount Sinai alumni
Greek emigrants to the United States
Expatriate academics in the United States
21st-century women scientists
21st-century biologists